810 Atossa (prov. designation:  or ) is a bright and elongated background asteroid from the region of the Flora family, located in the inner portion of the asteroid belt. It was discovered on 8 September 1915, by German astronomer Max Wolf at the Heidelberg-Königstuhl State Observatory in southern Germany. It was named after the ancient Persian queen Atossa (550–475 BC).

Orbit and classification 

Atossa is a non-family asteroid of the main belt's background population when applying the synthetic hierarchical clustering method (HCM) by Nesvorný to its proper orbital elements. However, in an older HCM-analysis by Zappalà from 1995, this asteroid is considered a member of the Flora family, a giant asteroid family and the largest family of stony asteroids in the main-belt. In a third HCM-analysis by Milani and Knežević (AstDyS), it is also a background asteroid, as this analysis does not recognize the Flora asteroid clan as a proper family.

Atossa orbits the Sun in the inner asteroid belt at a distance of 1.8–2.6 AU once every 3 years and 3 months (1,174 days; semi-major axis of 2.18 AU). Its orbit has an eccentricity of 0.18 and an inclination of 3° with respect to the ecliptic. The body's observation arc begins at Heidelberg Observatory with its official discovery observation on 8 September 1915.

Naming 

This minor planet was named after Atossa (550–475 BC), an ancient Persian queen, daughter of Cyrus, wife of Darius. The  was also mentioned in The Names of the Minor Planets by Paul Herget in 1955. The asteroids 7209 Cyrus and 7210 Darius were named after her father and husband, respectively.

Physical characteristics 

Atossa is an assumed, stony S-type asteroid, based on its high albedo (see below) and its proximity or potential membership to the stony Flora family.

Rotation period 

In August 2005, a rotational lightcurve of Atossa was obtained from photometric observations by French amateur astronomer Philippe Baudoin. Lightcurve analysis gave a well-defined rotation period of  hours with a high brightness variation of  magnitude, indicative of a non-spherical, elongated shape.

In 2011, a modeled lightcurve using data from the Uppsala Asteroid Photometric Catalogue (UAPC) and other sources gave a sidereal period  hours, as well as two spin axes at (12.0°, 67.0°) and (188.0°, 69.0°) in ecliptic coordinates (λ, β).

Diameter and albedo 

The Collaborative Asteroid Lightcurve Link assumes a standard albedo for a Florian asteroid of 0.24 and calculates a diameter of 8.58 kilometers based on an absolute magnitude of 12.5.

References

External links 
 Lightcurve Database Query (LCDB), at www.minorplanet.info
 Dictionary of Minor Planet Names, Google books
 Asteroids and comets rotation curves, CdR – Geneva Observatory, Raoul Behrend
 Discovery Circumstances: Numbered Minor Planets (1)-(5000) – Minor Planet Center
 
 

000810
Discoveries by Max Wolf
Named minor planets
19150908